Barry Railway Class B1 were 0-6-2T steam tank locomotives of the Barry Railway in South Wales.  They were designed by J. H. Hosgood and built by Sharp Stewart, & Co., Vulcan Foundry and Société Franco-Belge. The locomotive, though similar to the B class, differed in having an increased tank capacity of 1,630 gallons compared with the 1,400 gallons of the B class.  The purpose of this was to enable them to take a train of empty wagons from Cadoxton Yard to Trehafod Junction without the need to refill the tank.

Their main duty was to take loaded coal trains from Trehafod Junction, and the pits on the Brecon & Merthyr, to Cadoxton Yard and return either with the empty wagons or occasionally pit props from Barry Docks.  However they could also be seen pulling colliers' trains between Barry and Porth as well as excursion trains from various locations to Barry Island.  In particular 2 B1 class locomotives, nos. 111 and 122, were used to take excursion trains from the Rhymney Railway to Barry for those visiting the National Eisteddfod held there in 1920.  B1s could also be seen pulling the 'Ports Express' from Barry to Newcastle over the Barry Railway section of the journey between Barry and Cardiff.

The locomotives passed to the Great Western Railway in 1922 and 20 survived into British Railways ownership in 1948. However, all 20 had been withdrawn by 1952 and none were preserved.

Build details

References

The Locomotives of the Great Western Railway, part ten: Absorbed Engines, 1922–1947, Reed, P.J.T. et al, Railway Correspondence and Travel Society RCTS (April 1966), pp K30-K33
Locomotive and Train Working in the Latter Part of the Nineteenth Century, Ahrons, E.L, W. Heffer & Sons Ltd (1953), p112
The Barry Railway, Barrie, D.S.M., The Oakwood Press (1962 – reprinted with additions 1983), pp. 197–198  
Rails to Prosperity – the Barry & After 1884 to 1984, Miller, Brian J, Regional Publications (Bristol) Limited (1984), pp. 9–11  
The Barry Railway – Diagrams and photographs of Locomotives, Coaches and Wagons, Mountford, Eric R, The Oakwood Press (1987) p. 10  
A pictorial record of Great Western Absorbed Engines, Russell, J.H., Oxford Publishing Company (1978) pp. 28–33  

B1
0-6-2T locomotives
Sharp Stewart locomotives
Vulcan Foundry locomotives
Franco-Belge locomotives
Railway locomotives introduced in 1890
Standard gauge steam locomotives of Great Britain
Scrapped locomotives
Freight locomotives